Deeral is a town and coastal locality in the Cairns Region, Queensland, Australia.

Geography 

Deeral has an unusual "J"-shape boundaries. The eastern part is a long section of beach facing the Coral Sea and its immediate hinterland; this land is undeveloped and controlled by the Queensland Government. The western part is a curved section of freehold land, cleared and used for farming especially sugarcane. Both of these areas are low-lying (less than 10 metres above sea level). In the very far west of the locality the land begins rises rapidly towards the adjacent Bellenden Ker Range in neighbouring Wooroonooran; this land is undeveloped.

The town is located in the south-western part of the locality. The Bruce Highway and the North Coast railway line traverse the locality, adjacent and parallel, from the south-west of the locality through to the north-west of the "curve of the J", passing through the town, which is served by the Deeral railway station (known as Munros Camp railway station from 1883 to 1912).

The Mulgrave River forms the north-eastern boundary of the "curve", then cross the locality to form the southern boundary of the eastern beach part of the locality entering the Coral Sea at that point.

History 
The town was built on Yidinji tribal territory.  The town's name was derived from its railway station's name which was named Deeral in 1912, an Aboriginal word in the Yidinyji language meaning teeth.

Community groups 
The Deeral branch of the Queensland Country Women's Association meets at the CWA Hall at 68925 Bruce Highway.

References

External links 

 
 Town map of Deeral, 1968

Towns in Queensland
Cairns Region
Coastline of Queensland
Localities in Queensland